Balangiga: Howling Wilderness is a 2017 Filipino film directed by Khavn De La Cruz and one of the circle competition entries to the 5th QCinema International Film Festival or QCinema. This movie shows, in the eyes of an eight-year-old, the tragedy that occurred in the days of 1901 when the Americans were supposed to identify with the Balangiga and other parts of Samar, including the events following the brutal massacre of several Samarnon and how they fled elsewhere to the neighboring island. The movie's shooting location took place in different parts of Samar, Leyte and Zambales (Central Luzon). Although there were various issues the movie received just before its release to the public, it still managed to receive several top recognition from various prestigious award-giving bodies in the Philippines, including the highest "Best Picture" award. The director of this movie receives “Best Director” as well as the movie stars who were based in Tacloban City.

It had a Philippine nationwide theatrical release from August 15–21, 2018 in selected SM Cinemas, Gateway Cineplex, Robinsons Movieworld and Cinema '76 theaters as part of the Special Feature Section of 2nd Pista ng Pelikulang Pilipino.

It was also shown as part of World Cinema section of the 24th edition of International Film Festival of Kerala in India, and also exhibited in Exground Film Festival in Wiesbaden, Germany last November 2018; further, it was also selected to be screened at the 20th edition of Jeonju International Film Festival held at the city of Jeonju, North Jeolla Province, South Korea in May 2019 under the Newtro Jeonju section, which was created to celebrate the 20th anniversary of Jeonju IFF and a special program that sheds light on the contemporary artists who have shared their vision with JIFF for the last 20 years. And, was awarded the coveted Jury Prize at the 5th Bangkok ASEAN Film Festival during the closing ceremony held in Cinema Central World, Bangkok, Thailand.

Cast

Main cast

 Justine Samson as Kulas
 Pio Del Rio as Apoy Buroy
 Warren Tuaño as Bola
 Daniel Palisa as American soldier

Supporting cast
Jun Sabayton
 Althea Vega
 Don Gordon Bell
 Lourd de Veyra
 Roxlee

Reception
The film has received critical acclaim in the Philippines.

According to Oggs Cruz of Rappler.com, "Balangiga: Howling Wilderness navigates its seemingly simple narrative around the very relevant tenuous relations the Philippines has with America. The film has clear political implications and suggestions. Yet as soon as it ends with an ironic burst of animated hues and figures, it graduates from being a mere document on the sufferings and indignity of a nation under a colonial power's regime."

Prof. Joel David notes in his review, "Khavn deploys cinematic tricks (stop-motion animation, disorienting lenses, startling drone footage, etc.) as well as basic special effects that serve to emblematize the childhood world of Kulas. His persistent (though inevitably sordid) humor, tenderhearted embrace of Otherness, and contempt for everything represented by modern existence and its enforcement via wholesale genocidal-if-necessary violence – these make of "Balangiga" all that Filipinos can claim so far as their retribution for the incredible injustice visited on the country's distant central island over a century ago."

Arnorld Alamon of Sunstar reviewed the film positively and writes, "the film Balangiga: Howling Wilderness is a cinematic experience that is difficult to put in words and is better felt than described. [...] The end is not to cease but to destroy, or as the film puts succinctly – WAZAK!"

However, according to Businessworld the film was not rated/graded by the Cinema Evaluation Board of the Film Development Council of the Philippines and writes, "One reviewer finds it “a rambling narrative with no clear direction.” Another cites the attack against Catholicism, particularly “the grotesquely, lewd scene of a shaman masturbating while singing Salve Regina.” The reviewer concludes that “Over all, the Balangiga story is ultimately bigger than the story of hate, murder, and sexual perversion that this film unfortunately chose to focus on."

Accolades

References

Philippine drama films
Films directed by Khavn